George Pyne (1841–?) was English Medal of Honor recipient.

George Pyne may also refer to:

 George Pyne II (1909–1974), American football player
 George Pyne III (1941–2015), American football player
 George Pyne (business executive) (born 1965), American businessman